This is a list of early Canadian newspapers.

Canada East (Quebec)

Aylmer
Times                   
Ottawa and Pontiac Advertiser
Drummondville
Reporter
Granby
Eastern Townships Gazette
Montreal
Argus      
Bank-note Reporter
Canada Insurance Gazette
Canada Temperance Advocate
Canadian Mail
Canadian Naturalist and Geologist          
Canadian Presbyterian                      
Canadian Railroad and Steamboat Guide      
Commercial Advertiser                      
Farmer's Journal                           
Montreal Gazette                       
Grande Ligne Evangelical Register          
Montreal Herald                        
Journal d'Agriculture                      
Journal de l'Instruction Publique          
Journal of Education C.E.;Juvenile Presbyterian
La Minerve                                 
La Patrie                                  
L'Avenir                                       
Le Pays                
Liberal Christian                              
Lower Canada Jurist                            
Medical Chronicle                              
Missionary Record                              
Montreal Transcript                            
Montreal Witness                               
New Era                                        
Pilot                                          
Presbyterian                                   
Semeur Canadien                                
True Witness
Quebec City
Le Canadien
Quebec Chronicle-Telegraph
Chronicle                     
Colonist                      
Courier du Canada             
Gazette                       
Journal De Quebec             
Mercury                       
Military Gazette of Canada    
Le National
Sinclair's Monthly Circular
Richmond
County Advocate
Sorel
Gazette de Sorel
Stanstead
Stanstead Journal
St. Hyacinthe
Le Courier
St. Johns
News                          
Frontier Advocate
Trois Rivières
Ère Nouvelle                            
Inquirer
Waterloo
Advertiser

Canada West (Ontario)

Alliston
 Herald 1871 
Arnprior
 Chronicle 1871
 Arthur
 Enterprise News 1862
Ayr
Observer
Aurora
 Banner 1853
Barrie
Herald   
Northern Advance
Beaverton
Weekly Post
Belleville
Hastings Chronicle               
Intelligencer
Berlin (Kitchener)
Chronicle
Der Deutsche Canadier
Berliner Journal
Telegraph
Blenheim
Rond Eau News                 
Blenheim News
Blenheim World
Blenheim Tribune
Bowmanville
Canadian Statesman                 
Star
Bradford
Chronicle
Brantford
Brant County Herald            
Christian Messenger            
Courier                        
Expositor
Brampton
Standard   
Times
Brighton
Christian Banner             
Weekly Flag
Brockville
Monitor                          
Recorder
Caledon
 Enterprise 1888
Caledonia
Grand River Sachem
Carleton Place
Herald
 Canadian 1876
Cayuga
Sentinel
Chatham
Kent Advertiser            
Planet                     
Provincial Freeman
Cobourg
Star                       
Sun
Colborne
Northumberland Pilot                                
Transcript
Collingwood
Enterprise
Cornwall
Constitutional               
Freeholder
Dundas
Warder
Star News 1883
Dunville
Independent
Elora
Backwoodsman

Embrun                                                                                                              
Le Village
Fergus
British Constitution     
Freeholder
Forest
Forest Free Press
Forest Standard
Fonthill
Welland Herald
Galt
Dumfries Reformer    
Reporter
Goderich
Huron Signal
Gravenhurst
 Banner 1866
Guelph
Guelph Advertiser
Guelph Chronicle 
Guelph Herald    
Guelph Weekly Mercury and Advertiser
Guelph Advocate                     
Guelph Daily Mercury 1867
Hamilton
Banner                       
Canada Evangelist            
Canada Zeitung (German)      
Canadian Journal of Homeopathy
Christian Advocate            
Journal and Express           
Spectator c. 1846
Huntsville
 Forester c. 1877
Ingersoll
Chronicle
Kemptville
Progressionist
 Advance
Kincardine
Western Canadian Commonwealth                   
Bruce Reporter                   
Bruce Review                   
Kincardine Standard
Kincardine Review
Kingston
British Whig                 
Chronicle and News           
Commercial Advertiser        
Daily News                   
Morning Herald
Lindsay
Advocate
 Listowel
 Banner c. 1866
 Standard 1878
 Atwood Bee 1890-1923
London
Atlas                    
Canadian Free Press
Evangelical Witness                      
Prototype
Markham
Economist c. 1856 - now Markham Economist & Sun
Sun c. 1881
Millbrook
Messenger
Merrickville
Chronicle                            
Freemason's Magazine
Milton
Halton Journal
Milverton
 Sun 1891-1992
Mitchell
 Advocate 1860
Napanee
Reformer, Standard
New Hamburg
Neutrale
Independent 1878
Newburg
Index
New Castle
Recorder
Newmarket
New Era c. 1853
Niagara
Gleaner and Niagara Newspaper
Mail
Upper Canada Guardian; or Freeman's Journal
Oakville
Sentinel
Omemee
Warder
 Orangeville
 Banner c. 1893
Orono
Day Dawn               
Sun
Oshawa
Christian Offering, Vindicator
Ottawa
Bytown Gazette
Canada Military Gazette
Citizen
Railway and Commercial Times
Tribune
Owen Sound
Times
Paris
Star
Parry Sound
 North Star c. 1874
Pembroke
Observer
Penetangore
Western Canadian Commonwealth
Perth
Bathurst Courier c. 1834 - now Perth Courier       
British Standard
Peterborough
Examiner                             
Review
Picton
Gazette                  
Times
Port DOver
Express
Port Hope
Atlas                          
Guide
Port Perry
 The Star c. 1866
Prescott
Conservative Messenger       
Telegraph
Preston
Zeitung
 Renfrew, Ontario
 Mercury c. 1871
Richmond Hill
York Ridings Gazette
Russell
Russell Reader
Sandwich
British Canadian  
Voice of the Fugitive           
Maple Leaf                   
Windsor Herald
Sarnia
CW                       
Observer                 
Lambton Advertiser
Sherbrooke
CE           
Canadian Times
Gazette
Simcoe
Conservative Standard    
Norfolk Messenger
Smith Falls
Record News c. 1887
Southampton
Morning Star
Stayner
 The Sun c. 1877
Stratford
CW                             
Beacon                         
Examiner                       
Perth County News
 Weekly Herald 1863
 Times 1876-1891 
Streetsville
Review
St. Catharines
CW               
Constitutional   
Journal          
Post
St. Marys
Argus c. 1857                         
Journal c. 1893
St. Thomas
Despatch
 Thornhill
 Liberal c. 1878
Thorold
Gazette
Toronto
Agriculturalist
Canada Church Chronicle
Canada Gazette
Canada Sunday School Advocate
Canadian Ecclesiastical Gazette
Canadian Independent
Canadian Journal
Catholic Citizen
Christian Guardian
Colonial Advocate
Colonist (British Colonist)
Constitution
Der Beobachter (The Observer)
Ecclesiastical and Missionary record
Echo, and Protestant Episcopal Recorder
Gospel Tribune
Toronto Globe
Journal of Education
Toronto Leader
Market Review and Weekly Price Current
Merchant's Magazine
Toronto Mirror
Toronto News (Afternoon News)
Toronto Patriot
Toronto Times
Toronto Weekly Message
Union Baptist
United Presbyterian Magazine
Upper Canada Law Journal
 Walkerton
 Herald-Times c. 1861
 Wingham, Ontario
 Wingham Advance Times c. 1871
York Observer
Waterloo
Farmer's Friend (German)
 Record c. 1878
Whitby
Chronicle
Commonwealth
Ontario Reporter
Windsor
Churchman's Friend
Woodstock
Gazetteer
Sentinel
Times

See also
 History of Canadian newspapers

Early
Economic history of Canada
History of newspapers
History of mass media in Canada